UnGagged is a search engine optimization and digital marketing conference. The purpose of the semi-annual event is to provide a platform for speakers to present uncensored content to audiences behind closed doors without recordings. UnGagged is an international event, but to date all of the presentations, media and related content has been produced in the English language.

History
The inaugural conference was held at Caesar's Palace in Las Vegas in November 2014 and had approximately 300 attendees, 30 speakers and 16 sponsors. The second event was held in London in May 2015 and had approximately 200 attendees. The third event was held in Las Vegas in November 2015 and had approximately 300 attendees.

The latest UnGagged event was planned to be held in London, starting on July 11, 2022, and lasting a total of three days (till July 13th, 2022). However, it got postponed to 2023.

Overview
The conference tackles the subjects of web strategy, social media, search engine optimization, affiliate marketing, content marketing, mobile marketing, behavioral targeting, and graphic design. Past attendees of the conference include Bing, CBS Interactive, LinkedIn, Oracle, Yahoo, Shopify, and others.

The recording ban
The UnGagged events forbid any video or audio recording to encourage their speakers to speak freely and have an unbiased discussion.

It is forbidden for speakers to have any hidden agendas, sales pitches or self-promotional content.

Events
The UnGagged events are held each year in London and Las Vegas. More locations are planned to be introduced in the future.

References

External links 
 Official Website - information about upcoming events and registration.
 Official Twitter - latest news and media.

Search engine optimization
Business conferences